One Virgin Too Many is a 1999 historical mystery crime novel by Lindsey Davis and the 11th book of the Marcus Didius Falco Mysteries series.  Set in Rome between 27 May and 7 June AD 74, the novel stars Marcus Didius Falco, informer and imperial agent. The title refers to the Vestal Virgins lottery that is a key plot device.

Plot summary

When a frightened child approaches Marcus Didius Falco with a plea for help, he does not believe her. One quarrel with the family does not mean that a relation is trying to kill her. Beset by his own family troubles, his new responsibilities as Procurator of the Sacred Poultry, and the continuing search for a new partner, he decides to send her home.

However, he almost immediately regrets it. Gaia Laelia comes from a pre-eminent Roman family with a long history of key religious positions. Gaia, herself, is considered the most likely candidate for election to the office of Vestal Virgin. When she disappears, Falco is officially asked to investigate.

Meanwhile, Helena's brother Aelianus has problems of his own. In an attempt to restart his political career - stalled by his younger brother's elopement with his wealthy fiancee - he tries to gain election to the Arval Brethren. During the night-time ceremonies, however, Aelianus stumbles across the body of one of the Brethren with his throat cut as if he had been sacrificed.

Unable to bring in the Vigiles, Falco is forced to search the house of Gaia Laelia alone, aware that time is running out for finding her before the lottery takes place, or even alive.

Characters in One Virgin Too Many
 A. Camillus Aelianus - Older brother of Helena
 Anacrites - Chief Spy
 Ariminius Modullus - Priest
 Athene - Gaia's nursemaid
 Berenice - Queen of Judaea and lover of Titus
 Caecilia Paeta - Mother of Gaia
 Cloelia - Maia's daughter
 Constantia - Vestal Virgin
 Decimus Camillus Verus - Father of Helena, Aulus and Justinus
 Fabius - Falco's uncle
 Gaia Laelia - Wannabe Vestal Virgin
 Geminus - Father of Falco, Auctioneer
 Glaucus and Cotta - Bath House Contractors
 Helena Justina - Wife of Falco, and daughter of the Senator Decimus Camillus Verus
 Julia Junilla - Daughter of Falco and Helena
 Junilla Tacita - Mother of Falco
 Laelius Scaurus - Father of Gaia
 Laelius Numentinus - Priest
 Lucius Petronius Longus - Friend of Falco and Vigiles Officer
 Maia Favonia - Falco's widowed sister
 Marcus Didius Falco - Informer and Imperial Agent.
 Marius - Maia's son
 Meldina - Freewoman
 Q. Camillus Justinus - Younger brother of Helena
 Rubella - Tribune of the Fourth Cohort of Vigiles
 Rutilius Gallicus - Ex-consul
 Statilia Laelia - Aunt of Gaia
 Terentia Paulla - Ex-Vestal Virgin
 Titus Caesar - Son of Vespasian
 Ventidius Silanus - Arval Brother
 Vespasian - Emperor of Rome

Major themes
 Investigation into the disappearance of a young girl who is expected to be the next Vestal.
 Investigation into the murder of one of the Arval Brethren.

Allusions/references to actual history, geography and current science
 Set in Rome in AD 74, during the reign of Emperor Vespasian.
 In Ancient Rome, the Vestal Virgins (sacerdos Vestalis), were the virgin holy priestesses of Vesta, the goddess of the hearth. Their primary task was to maintain the sacred fire of Vesta. The Vestal duty brought great honor and afforded greater privileges to women who served in that role.  They were the only female priests within the Roman religious system.
 The Arval Brethren (Latin: Fratres Arvales) were a body of priests in ancient Rome who offered annual sacrifices to lares and gods to guarantee good harvests. The modern world knows them mainly for their stone-carved records of their oaths, rituals and sacrifices.

Release details
 1999, UK, Century Hardback    
 2000, UK, Arrow, Paperback    
 UK,  Chivers/BBC AudioBooks,  read by Christopher Scott,  
 2000, UK, Isis, Large Print  
 2000, US, Mysterious Press, Hardback   
 US, Mysterious Press, Paperback

References

External links 
lindseydavis.co.uk Author's Official Website

1999 British novels
Marcus Didius Falco novels
Historical novels
74
Century (imprint) books